San Paolo della Croce a Corviale is a 20th-century parochial church and titular church in the western suburbs of Rome, dedicated to Saint Paul of the Cross.

History 

The church was built in the early 1980s and was consecrated on 16 April 1983. Dedicated to Paul of the Cross, the patron's day is celebrated every October 17.

On 25 May 1985, it was made a titular church to be held by a cardinal-priest.

On 15 April 2018 the church was visited by Pope Francis.

Cardinal-Protectors
Louis-Albert Vachon (1985–2006)
 Oswald Gracias (2007–present)

References

External links

Titular churches
Rome S. VIII Gianicolense
Roman Catholic churches completed in 1983
20th-century Roman Catholic church buildings in Italy